In mathematics, and especially differential topology, functional analysis and singularity theory, the Whitney topologies are a countably infinite family of topologies defined on the set of smooth mappings between two smooth manifolds. They are named after the American mathematician Hassler Whitney.

Construction
Let M and N be two real, smooth manifolds. Furthermore, let C∞(M,N) denote the space of smooth mappings between M and N. The notation C∞ means that the mappings are infinitely differentiable, i.e. partial derivatives of all orders exist and are continuous.

Whitney Ck-topology
For some integer , let Jk(M,N) denote the k-jet space of mappings between M and N. The jet space can be endowed with a smooth structure (i.e. a structure as a C∞ manifold) which make it into a topological space. This topology is used to define a topology on C∞(M,N).

For a fixed integer  consider an open subset  and denote by Sk(U) the following:

The sets Sk(U) form a basis for the Whitney Ck-topology on C∞(M,N).

Whitney C∞-topology
Let us denote by Wk the set of open subsets of C∞(M,N) with respect to the Whitney Ck-topology. Then the Whitney C∞-topology is defined to be the topology whose basis is given by W, where:

Dimensionality
Notice that C∞(M,N) has infinite dimension, whereas Jk(M,N) has finite dimension. In fact, Jk(M,N) is a real, finite-dimensional manifold. To see this, let  denote the space of polynomials, with real coefficients, in m variables of order at most k and with zero as the constant term. This is a real vector space with dimension

Writing } then, by the standard theory of vector spaces  and so is a real, finite-dimensional manifold. Next, define:

Using b to denote the dimension Bkm,n, we see that , and so is a real, finite-dimensional manifold.

In fact, if M and N have dimension m and n respectively then:

Topology
Given the Whitney C∞-topology, the space C∞(M,N) is a Baire space, i.e. every residual set is dense.

References

Differential topology
Singularity theory